The following television stations broadcast on digital or analog channel 33 in Mexico:

 XEIPN-TDT in Mexico City
 XHACG-TDT in Acapulco, Guerrero
 XHAK-TDT in Hermosillo, Sonora
 XHBU-TDT in Ciudad Jiménez, Chihuahua
 XHCOSL-TDT in Matehuala, San Luis Potosí
 XHCPE-TDT in Perote, Veracruz
 XHCSO-TDT in Ciudad Obregón, Sonora 
 XHCTCI-TDT in Culiacán, Sinaloa
 XHCTH-TDT in Ciudad Cuauhtémoc, Chihuahua
 XHCTLM-TDT in Los Mochis, Sinaloa
 XHCTSL-TDT in San Luis Potosí, San Luis Potosí
 XHCTTI-TDT in Tijuana, Baja California
 XHDEH-TDT in Ciudad Delicias, Chihuahua
 XHDGO-TDT in Durango, Durango 
 XHGSF-TDT in San Felipe, Guanajuato 
 XHJAL-TDT in Guadalajara, Jalisco 
 XHJN-TDT in Huajuapan de León, Oaxaca 
 XHJUB-TDT in Ciudad Juárez, Chihuahua 
 XHLAC-TDT in Lázaro Cárdenas, Michoacán
 XHLAT-TDT in Nuevo Laredo, Tamaulipas
 XHLAV-TDT in La Venta, Tabasco 
 XHLL-TDT in Villahermosa, Tabasco 
 XHLLO-TDT in Saltillo, Coahuila
 XHMAS-TDT in Celaya, Guanajuato
 XHMEY-TDT in Mérida, Yucatán
 XHMTCO-TDT in Monclova, Coahuila
 XHNAC-TDT in Naco, Sonora 
 XHOR-TDT in Matamoros, Tamaulipas
 XHPCE-TDT in Puerto Escondido, Oaxaca
 XHPES-TDT in Puerto Peñasco, Sonora
 XHPNW-TDT in Piedras Negras, Coahuila
 XHSTV-TDT in Santiago Tuxtla, Veracruz
 XHTFL-TDT in Tepic, Nayarit 
 XHVCA-TDT in Cerro Azul, Veracruz

33